Tadeusz Bartosik (15 May 1925 – 16 April 1985) was a Polish actor. He appeared in twenty-one films and television shows between 1959 and 1985.

Selected filmography
 Bad Luck (1960)
 Samson (1961)
 Mandrin (1962)

References

External links

1925 births
1985 deaths
Polish male film actors
People from Kraków County